Vestfossen Idrettsforening is a Norwegian sports club from Vestfossen, Øvre Eiker, Buskerud. It has sections for association football, team handball, Nordic skiing, gymnastics and tennis.

It was founded on January 20, 1910.

The men's football team plays in the Third Division, the fourth tier of Norwegian football.

The club has also been represented in the leadership of Norwegian sports, since Tove Paule represents the club.

References

Official site 

Football clubs in Norway
Association football clubs established in 1910
Sport in Buskerud
Athletics clubs in Norway
1910 establishments in Norway